Vera Constance Lutz, ( Smith, 1912–1976), was a British economist. She was married to the German economist Friedrich Lutz.

Career
Smith was born in Kent, England, and studied at the London School of Economics between 1930 and 1935 for a PhD. In 1937, she married German economist Friedrich Lutz, and the couple moved to Princeton University prior to the start of the Second World War, and moved to Zurich in 1951. Lutz's main areas of study were credit theory, economic development theory and labour economics. Vera and Friedrich's 1951 work Theory of Investment of the Firm was said to have "greatly influenced modern capital theory, and would remain a major source of reference for the next decade". Lutz's work Italy, a Study in Economic Development used neoclassical economics, and focused on the differences between Northern and Southern Italy, and the monopolistic behaviour of Italian industry. Vera and Friedrich had been invited to Italy by the Banca d'Italia.

Works
 The Rationale of Central Banking and the Free Banking Alternative, 1936.
Theory of Investment of the Firm, with Friedrich Lutz, 1951.
Real and Monetary Factors in the Determination of Employment Levels, 1952.
Multiplier and Velocity Analysis: A Marriage, 1955.
Italy, a Study in Economic Development, 1963.
Central Planning for the Market Economy: An Analysis of the French Theory and Experience, 1969.
Source:

References

British economists
British women economists
1912 births
1976 deaths
People from Kent
Alumni of the London School of Economics